Shang Yang (c. 390 – 338 BC), also known as Wei Yang and originally surnamed Gongsun, was a Chinese jurist, philosopher, and politician. Born in the Zhou vassal state of Wei during the Warring States period, he was a statesman, chancellor and reformer serving the State of Qin, where his policies laid the administrative, political and economic foundations that strengthened the Qin state and would eventually enable Qin to conquer the other six rival states, unifying China into a centralized rule for the first time in history under the Qin dynasty. Scholars consider it likely that both he and his followers contributed to The Book of Lord Shang, a foundational philosophical work for the school of Chinese legalism.

Biography
Shang Yang was born as the son of a concubine to the ruling family of the minor state Wey (衞). His surname (氏, lineage name) was Gongsun and his personal name Yang. As a member of the Wei family, he was also known as Wei Yang.

At a young age, Yang studied law and obtained a position under Prime Minister Shuzuo of Wei (魏, not the same as his birth state). With the support of Duke Xiao of Qin, Yang left his lowly position in Wei to become the chief adviser in Qin. His numerous reforms transformed the peripheral Qin state into a militarily powerful and strongly centralized kingdom. Changes to the state's legal system (which were said to have been built upon Li Kui's Canon of Laws) propelled the Qin to prosperity. Enhancing the administration through an emphasis on meritocracy, his policies weakened the power of the feudal lords.

In 341 BC, Qin attacked the state of Wei. Yang personally led the Qin army to defeat Wei, and eventually Wei ceded the land west of the Yellow River to Qin. For his role in the war, Yang received 15 cities in Shang as his personal fief and became known as the lord of Shang (Shang Jun) or Shang Yang. According to the Records of the Grand Historian, with his personal connections while serving in the court of Wei, Shang Yang invited Gongzi Ang, the Wei general, to negotiate a peace treaty. As soon as Ang arrived, he was taken prisoner, and the Qin army attacked, successfully defeating their opponents.

Mark Edward Lewis once identified his reorganization of the military as responsible for the orderly plan of roads and fields throughout north China. This might be far fetched, but Yang was as much a military reformer as a legal one. Yang oversaw the construction of Xianyang.

The Shang Yang school of thought was favoured by Emperor Wu of Han, and John Keay mentions that Tang figure Du You was drawn to Shang Yang.

Reforms
He is credited by Han Fei, often considered to be the greatest representative of Chinese Legalism (法家), with the creation of two theories;

"fixing the standards"
"equality before the law"

Believing in the rule of law and considering loyalty to the state above that of the family, Yang introduced two sets of changes to the State of Qin. The first, in 356 BC, were:
Li Kui's Book of Law was implemented, with the important addition of a rule providing punishment equal to that of the perpetrator for those aware of a crime but failing to inform the government.  He codified reforms into enforceable laws. The laws were stringent and multitudinous reformed by Yang and the punishments were strict.
Assigning land to soldiers based upon their military successes and stripping nobility unwilling to fight of their land rights. The army was separated into twenty military ranks, based upon battlefield achievements. The reform of military made Qin citizens willing to join the army and helped the Qin dynasty build the military power necessary to unify China.
As manpower was short in Qin, Yang encouraged the cultivation of unsettled lands and wastelands and immigration, favouring agriculture over luxury commerce (though also paying more recognition to especially successful merchants).

Yang introduced his second set of changes in 350 BC, which included a new standardized system of land allocation and reforms to taxation.

The vast majority of Yang's reforms were taken from policies instituted elsewhere, such as from Wu Qi of the State of Chu; however, Yang's reforms were more thorough and extreme than those of other states, and monopolized policy in the hands of the ruler. Under his tenure, Qin quickly caught up with and surpassed the reforms of other states.

Domestic policies
Yang introduced land reforms, privatized land, rewarded farmers who exceeded harvest quotas, enslaved farmers who failed to meet quotas, and used enslaved subjects as (state-owned) rewards for those who met government policies.

As manpower was short in Qin relative to the other states at the time, Yang enacted policies to increase its manpower. As Qin peasants were recruited into the military, he encouraged active migration of peasants from other states into Qin as a replacement workforce; this policy simultaneously increased the manpower of Qin and weakened the manpower of Qin's rivals. Yang made laws forcing citizens to marry at a young age and passed tax laws to encourage raising multiple children. He also enacted policies to free convicts who worked in opening wastelands for agriculture. 

Yang partly abolished primogeniture (depending on the performance of the son) and created a double tax on households that had more than one son living in the household, to break up large clans into nuclear families.

Yang moved the capital from the city of Yueyang to Xianyang, in order to reduce the influence of nobles on the administration. Xianyang remained Qin's capital until its fall in 207 BC.

Death
Yang was deeply despised by the Qin nobility and became vulnerable after the death of Duke Xiao. The next ruler, King Huiwen, ordered the nine familial exterminations against Yang and his family, on the grounds of fomenting rebellion. Yang had previously humiliated the new duke "by causing him to be punished for an offense as though he were an ordinary citizen." According to Zhan Guo Ce, Yang went into hiding; at one point Yang was refused a room at an inn because one of his own laws prevented admission of a guest without proper identification.

Yang was executed by jūliè (: dismemberment by being fastened to five chariots, cattle or horses and being torn to pieces); his whole family was also executed. Despite his death, King Huiwen kept the reforms enacted by Yang. 

A number of alternate versions of Yang's death have survived. According to Sima Qian in his Records of the Grand Historian, Yang first escaped to Wei. However, he was hated there for his earlier betrayal of Gongzi Ang and was expelled. Yang then fled to his fiefdom, where he raised a rebel army but was killed in battle. After the battle, King Hui of Qin had Yang's corpse torn apart by chariots as a warning to others.

Following the execution of Yang, King Huiwen turned away from the central valley south to conquer Sichuan (Shu and Ba) in what Steven Sage calls a "visionary reorientation of thinking" toward material interests in Qin's bid for universal rule.

Assessments
Keeping in mind the information of the time (1955) and the era of which he is speaking, A. F. P. Hulsewé goes as far as to call Shang Yang the "founder of the school of law", and considers his unification of punishments one of his most important contributions, that is, giving the penalty of death to any grade of person disobeying the king's orders.

In fiction and popular culture
 Portrayed by Shi Jingming in The Legend of Mi Yue (2015) as a guest appearance, depicting his execution.
 Portrayed by Wang Zhifei in the TV series The Qin Empire as a main character.

See also
Shizi

Notes

References
 Zhang, Guohua, "Shang Yang". Encyclopedia of China (Law Edition), 1st ed.
 Xie, Qingkui, "Shang Yang" . Encyclopedia of China (Political Science Edition), 1st ed.
国史概要 (第二版) 
戰國策 (Zhan Guo Ce), 秦第一

Further reading
Li Yu-ning, ShangYang's Reforms (M.E. Sharpe Inc., 1977).
 Sterckx, Roel. Chinese Thought. From Confucius to Cook Ding. London: Penguin, 2019.

External links

 
 
 
 

390s BC births
338 BC deaths
Year of birth uncertain
4th-century BC Chinese people
4th-century BC executions
4th-century BC Chinese philosophers
Chinese legal scholars
Chinese legal writers
Chinese reformers
Chinese political philosophers
Executed people from Henan
Executed Qin dynasty people
Legalism (Chinese philosophy)
People executed by the Qin dynasty
Philosophers from Henan
Philosophers of law
Politicians from Puyang
Social philosophers
Theoretical historians
Victims of familial execution
Wey (state)
Year of birth unknown
Zhou dynasty philosophers
Zhou dynasty politicians
Qin state people